|}

The Dublin Chase is a Grade 1 National Hunt steeplechase in Ireland which is open to horses aged five years or older. It is run at Leopardstown over a distance of about 2 miles and 1 furlong (3,420 metres), and during its running there are eleven fences to be jumped. The race is scheduled to take place each year in early February. The race was first run as a Grade 2 race in 2018 as part of a new Dublin Racing Festival and was upgraded to Grade 1 status from the 2019 running.

Records
Most successful horse (3 wins):
 Chacun Pour Soi -  2020, 2021, 2022

Leading jockey (3 wins):
 Paul Townend - Chacun Pour Soi (2020, 2021, 2022) 

Leading trainer (6 wins):
 Willie Mullins -  Min (2018, 2019), Chacun Pour Soi (2020, 2021, 2022), Gentleman De Mee (2023)

Winners

See also
 Horse racing in Ireland
 List of Irish National Hunt races

References

 Racing Post:

National Hunt races in Ireland
National Hunt chases
Leopardstown Racecourse
Recurring sporting events established in 2018
2018 establishments in Ireland